Claude Louis Constant Esprit Juvénal Gabriel Corbineau (7 March 1772, Laval – 8 February 1807, battle of Eylau) was a French general. His two brothers Jean and Hercule also fought in both these wars and together the three men were known as "les trois Horaces" (the three Horatii).

Sources
Biography of Corbineau @ the Ecole Supérieure de Guerre.

1772 births
1807 deaths
People from Laval, Mayenne
French generals
French military personnel of the French Revolutionary Wars
French commanders of the Napoleonic Wars
French military personnel killed in the Napoleonic Wars
Names inscribed under the Arc de Triomphe